HMCS Moncton is a  that has served in the Canadian Forces since 1998. Moncton is the ninth ship of her class. She is the second vessel to use the designation . The ship is assigned to Maritime Forces Atlantic (MARLANT) and is homeported at CFB Halifax.

Design and description
The Kingston class was designed to fill the minesweeper, coastal patrol and reserve training needs of the Canadian Forces, replacing the s, s and Royal Canadian Mounted Police coastal launches in those roles. In order to perform these varied duties the Kingston-class vessels are designed to carry up to three  ISO containers with power hookups on the open deck aft in order to embark mission-specific payloads. The seven module types available for embarkation include four route survey, two mechanical minesweeping and one bottom inspection modules.

The coastal defence vessels are powered by four Jeumont ANR-53-50 alternators coupled to four Wärtsilä UD 23V12 diesel engines creating . Two LIPS Z-drive azimuth thrusters are driven by two Jeumont CI 560L motors creating  and the Z drives can be rotated 360°.

The Kingston class is equipped with a Kelvin Hughes navigational radar using the I band and a Kelvin Hughes 6000 surface search radar scanning the E and F bands. The vessels carry an AN/SQS-511 towed side scan sonar for minesweeping and a Remote-control Mine Hunting System (RMHS). The vessels are equipped with one Bofors 40 mm/60 calibre Mk 5C gun and two M2 machine guns. The 40 mm gun was declared obsolete and removed from the vessels in 2014. Some of them ended up as museum pieces and on display at naval reserve installations across Canada. The Kingston-class coastal defence vessels have a complement of 37.

Service history

Moncton was laid down on 31 May 1997 at Halifax Shipyards Ltd., Halifax, Nova Scotia and was launched on 5 December 1997. The ship was commissioned into the Canadian Forces on 12 July 1998 at Pointe-du-Chêne, New Brunswick and carries the classification MM 708.

In September 1998, Moncton was among the Canadian Forces ships that deployed off the coast of Nova Scotia after the crash of Swissair Flight 111. In 2000, the coastal defence vessel took part in the naval exercise Unified Spirit off the east coast and in 2001, sailed to participate in the NATO naval exercise Blue Game off Denmark and Norway with sister ship .

In August 2011, Moncton deployed to the Arctic Ocean as part of Operation Nanook. In February 2015, Moncton deployed to the Caribbean Sea as part of Operation Caribbe, Canada's contribution to the war on drugs.

In January 2016, Moncton, alongside sister ship , sailed for the Caribbean to take part in Operation Caribbe. During the operation, the ship visited Churchill, Manitoba and patrolled Hudson Bay. Shawinigan and Moncton returned to Halifax on 30 September. In February 2017, Summerside and Moncton deployed to the coast of West Africa in the Gulf of Guinea as part of the naval exercise Neptune Trident. The two ships conducted missions against pirates and illegal fishing, along with making port visits to Sierra Leone, Senegal, Liberia and Ivory Coast. During the deployment, Moncton took part in a joint training exercise with the Liberian Coast Guard. Summerside and Moncton returned to Halifax on 2 May after two-month deployment to West Africa. In November, Moncton was in the Caribbean to take part in Operation Caribbe. On 11 November, Moncton intercepted a suspect vessel, and her embarked United States Coast Guard LEDET unit boarded the vessel, seizing  of illegal cocaine.

From July through August 2018, Moncton deployed to the St. Lawrence River and the Great Lakes, visiting several Canadian ports. In October 2018, Moncton was among the Canadian ships deployed to the North Atlantic and Baltic Sea as part of the large NATO exercise, Trident Juncture.

In January 2023, Moncton and sister ship  sailed from Halifax for operations off West Africa in the Gulf of Guinea, participating in several exercises and diplomatic engagements in the area. However, with the situation in Haiti worsening, the Canadian government redeployed the two ships to the seas off that nation's capital Port-au-Prince for patrols in February.

References

Notes

Citations

Sources

External links
 HMCS Moncton (MM 708) – official website

 

Fleet of the Royal Canadian Navy
Kingston-class coastal defence vessels
1997 ships
Ships built in Nova Scotia
History of Moncton